Typhoon Wanda was one of the deadliest typhoons to impact China, and was the strongest typhoon to impact Zhejiang since Typhoon Nina in 1953.

Meteorological history 

A tropical depression developed southwest of Guam on July 25. It moved north-northeastward, passing east of the Northern Marianas. On July 27, it intensified into a tropical storm and was designated Wanda. On the same day, the storm turned more westward, steered by the subtropical ridge to the north. Low wind shear and warm waters allowed Wanda to intensify steadily, developing into an intense typhoon. After passing through the Miyako Islands, Wanda weakened slightly and traversed the East China Sea. Wanda slowly weakened while progressing through China, dissipating on August 5.

Impact 
Taipei on Taiwan recorded  of rainfall over three days while the typhoon would pass to the north. Along the coast of Zhejiang, Wanda produced a  storm surge that destroyed 465 seawalls and 902 boats. The storm also flooded crop fields, destroying 20,380 tons of wheat. Across Zhejiang, 2.2 million houses and 38.5% of the main roads were damaged during the storm. Nationwide, Wanda killed 4,935 people and injured 16,617 others.

See also 

 Other tropical cyclones of the same name

References

External links 
 Digital Typhoon : Typhoon 195606 (WANDA)  – National Institute of Informatics

Typhoons in China
1956 Pacific typhoon season
1956 in China